Monument to the Dream is a 1967 American short documentary film about the Gateway Arch National Park directed by Charles Guggenheim and narrated by Paul Richards. At the time of the film's production, the park was known as the Jefferson National Expansion Memorial. It was nominated for an Academy Award for Best Documentary Short.

See also
List of American films of 1967

References

External links

Monument to the Dream at the National Archives and Records Administration

1967 films
1967 documentary films
1967 short films
1967 independent films
1960s short documentary films
American short documentary films
American black-and-white films
Films directed by Charles Guggenheim
American independent films
Documentary films about architecture
Films set in St. Louis
Films shot in St. Louis
1960s English-language films
1960s American films